Archdiocese of Cape Town may refer to:

Anglican Diocese of Cape Town
Roman Catholic Archdiocese of Cape Town